Bühnensucht is a live album by Dutch rock and roll and blues group Herman Brood & His Wild Romance. The album reached No.41 on the Dutch album chart on 5 October 1985, and stayed on the chart for six weeks.

The album was re-released on CD by Telstar on 26 July 2001.

Track listing

Personnel
Herman Brood - piano, keyboards, vocals
David Hollestelle - guitar
Gee Carlsberg - bass
Ad Vanderee - drums
Robbie Schmitz - vocals
Lies Schilp - vocals

References 

Herman Brood & His Wild Romance albums
1985 live albums